Salvatore D'Alterio (born 17 February 1980) is an Italian footballer who plays for Serie D club Cavese.

Career
D'Alterio started his career at Campania team Casertana. He played 2 matches for the team before they were relegated to Serie D. D'Alterio would remain with Casertana for the next three seasons. Then in 2000, he moved to Nocerina in Serie C1. In mid-2001, he was signed by Messina of Serie B on a co-ownership deal. He was not a regular in the team and was after sometime loaned to Martina. In mid-2004 he returned to Messina, now in Serie A, he played 6 league matches.

He spent time at Serie C1 clubs Foggia and Taranto. Although a regular of Taranto, he terminated his contract with the club. He joined Portogruaro and in January 2010 left for Pescara and won promotion to Serie B six months later.

In January 2011 he was loaned to Lega Pro Prima Divisione side Salernitana. He returned to Pescara for pre-season.

In September 2011 he was signed by Serie D club Messina.

References

External links
Profile at Football.it 
Profile at Portogruaro 

1980 births
Living people
Sportspeople from the Province of Naples
Footballers from Campania
Italian footballers
Serie A players
Serie B players
Casertana F.C. players
A.S.G. Nocerina players
A.C.R. Messina players
A.S.D. Martina Calcio 1947 players
Calcio Foggia 1920 players
Taranto F.C. 1927 players
A.S.D. Portogruaro players
Delfino Pescara 1936 players
U.S. Salernitana 1919 players
Cavese 1919 players
Association football defenders]